Uncle Tom's Fairy Tales (also known as Bon Appétit and The Trial) is a 1969 American drama film directed by then-film student Penelope Spheeris and starring comedian Richard Pryor. The only known negative of the film was said to have been shredded by Pryor after a disagreement with his wife at the time.

However, in June 2005, scenes from the film appeared in a retrospective while  Pryor was being honored by the Directors Guild of America. In August 2005, Pryor and his wife and attorney-in-fact, Jennifer Lee-Pryor, filed a lawsuit against Spheeris and Pryor's own daughter, Rain. The suit claims that Spheeris and Pryor's daughter conspired to take the surviving film from his home sometime in the mid-1980s. According to the suit, he contacted Spheeris after the tribute. She allegedly revealed she had given the footage to the Academy Film Archive of the Academy of Motion Picture Arts and Sciences and intended to give the film to Rain.
Pryor died in December 2005 but the suit is still currently pending.

References

External links 
 

Films directed by Penelope Spheeris
1969 drama films
1960s unfinished films
Unreleased American films
American drama films
Films about the Black Panther Party
Films with screenplays by Richard Pryor
1960s English-language films
1960s American films